Presbyterian Church of Atlanta is a historic Presbyterian church located at Atlanta in Steuben County, New York, United States.  It was built in 1895 and is a Queen Anne style building constructed of red pressed brick over a limestone basement. The architect was Otis Dockstader of Elmira. The interior is designed on the Akron Plan.  Also on the property is a former horse shed that was converted in the 1920s for use as a Sunday School and Boy Scout facility. Founded after a devastating fire destroyed most of the downtown area of the village, the church has always served a broad cross section of the community. Having nearly closed the church is now experiencing a period of renewal. Services are at 11:00 AM on Sundays.

It was listed on the National Register of Historic Places in 2010.

References

Presbyterian churches in New York (state)
Churches completed in 1895
19th-century Presbyterian church buildings in the United States
Churches on the National Register of Historic Places in New York (state)
Churches in Steuben County, New York
Akron Plan church buildings
National Register of Historic Places in Steuben County, New York